The Nordstrom Sisters were an American cabaret act which performed internationally from 1931 to 1976.

Dagmar Nordstrom (1903–1976) the younger of the two sisters was a composer, arranger and the pianist of the duo. She wrote the music of Remembering You, a fox trot popular in the 1940s and released on records.

Sigfred Nordstrom (1893–1980), the elder sister, sang the lead and was the widow of Samuel Ferebee Williams (1883–1931), a confectionery executive who was the originator of the Tootsie Roll. They were married in 1919. Williams died in October 1931.

Originally from Chicago, the sisters were of Swedish and Norwegian origin. They were frequently billed as society performers. As international cabaret singers they were often styled as The Misses Nordstrom or introduced as those Park Avenue darlings, the Nordstrom Sisters. Their songs were full of sexual innuendo and double entendre.

The pair lived in London for a year in 1939, when they were the resident performers at The Ritz. They were often featured onboard transatlantic ocean liners favouring the Norwegian America Line and the Cunard Line. They were always booked in first class staterooms and took their automobile aboard ship as part of their compensation package. They would celebrate as the cars were first out of the hold of the ship. Everything they needed on the continent was packed in the car, and they were on their way as others were still waiting for their trunks. They sailed on the MS Sagafjord for her maiden round-the-world voyage. They always spent the month of October in Bad Gastein for the baths.

They entertained groups of 50—100 guests for cocktails for several nights to celebrate each of their birthdays and during the December and New Year holidays. Initially they had an apartment floor in Manhattan on 53rd Street, just east of Park Avenue. When that building was demolished for a new Chemical Bank building they, as Siggie used to say, moved to 'Albany' as the new apartment was on the north west corner of 79th Street at Third Avenue.

References

Musical groups established in 1931
American cabaret performers
American socialites
Nightlife in New York City
Musical groups from Chicago
People from the Upper East Side
Sibling musical duos
American musical duos
Female musical duos
Musical groups from New York City